Ciss is a surname (see also for a list of people with the name).

CISS may refer to:

 CISS-FM, Canadian radio station
Inter-American Centre for Social Security Studies a Social Security related international organisation in Latin America and the Caribbean
 Continuous Ink Supply System
 Center for Intelligence and Security Studies, a center at the University of Mississippi
 Concordia International School Shanghai,a coeducational day school Preschool to Grade 12 in Shanghai
 Computed Images System & Services division, a 1960s division of General Electric, now called "Genigraphics"
 Comité International des Sports des Sourds, "The International Committee of Sports for the Deaf"
 Canadian International School System